Michael W. LeMieur (born August 6, 1968) is a Minnesota politician and former member of the Minnesota House of Representatives who represented District 12B, which includes portions of Crow Wing and Morrison counties in the central part of the state. A Republican, he is also a small business owner.

LeMieur was first elected to the House in 2010. He served on the Agriculture and Rural Development Policy and Finance and the Jobs and Economic Development Finance committees. He was also a member of the State Government Finance Subcommittee for the Veterans Services Division and the Taxes Subcommittee for the Property and Local Tax Division.

LeMieur was born and raised in Little Falls. Active in his community, he served as a member and president of the Little Falls City Council. He has served on the Little Falls Fire Department for many years, and is a member of the Minnesota Fire Chief's Association and the Little Falls Fire Relief Association. He is also a member of the Minnesota Deer Hunters Association, Pheasants Forever and the National Rifle Association. His uncle, former State Representative Steve Wenzel, represented the same area from 1973 to 2001.

References

External links 

 Rep. LeMieur Web Page
 Map of Minnesota House District 12B
 Project Votesmart - Rep. Mike LeMieur Profile
 Mike LeMieur Campaign Web Site

1968 births
Living people
People from Little Falls, Minnesota
Republican Party members of the Minnesota House of Representatives
21st-century American politicians